Prophantis octoguttalis is a species of moth of the family Crambidae. The species was described by Baron Cajetan von Felder, Rudolf Felder and Alois Friedrich Rogenhofer in 1875. It is found on the Maluku Islands in Indonesia.

Identifications from Comoros, Madagascar and South Africa are possibly misidentifications that could be attributed to Prophantis smaragdina.

References
 Felder, Felder & Rogenhofer, 1864–1875. Reise der österreichischen Fregatte Novara um die Erde in den Jahren 1857, 1858, 1859 unter den Befehlen des Commodore B. von Wüllerstorf-Urbair. Zoologischer Theil. Zweiter Band. Abtheilung 2, Heft 4, Lepidoptera. Atlas der Heterocera. - — 2:1–20, pls. 1–140

Moths described in 1875
Spilomelinae
Moths of Madagascar
Moths of the Comoros
Moths of Africa
Moths of Indonesia